This is a list of flags used by the people of Iranic origin.

Historical

Before Islam

After Islam

Current

References

Flags of Iran